Emre Özdemir (born 1981) was an editorial cartoonist and illustrator for Zaman and Today's Zaman.

Early life and career 
In 2005, Özdemir graduated from Balıkesir University. That year, he began to draw a comic strip in the sports magazine of Zaman called “Sporvizyon”.  In 2007, he completed his master's degree at Marmara University Atatürk Faculty of Education.  Also in 2007, he began to draw editorial cartoons for the newspaper Today's Zaman and Zaman under his blog called “No Comment”. Between 2007 and 2009 he worked as Turkish Language Lecturer at the Russian State University for the Humanities. He is currently drawing illustration and editorial cartoons for some newspapers, magazines and books.

Awards 
In 2003, he was awarded with first prize at the competition organized by the Museum of Antiquities in Burdur.

In 2008, he was awarded with an Honorary Mention in “City Confusion” competition held in Iran.

References 
Cagle
Today's Zaman Newspaper
Zaman Newspaper

External links 
 Instagram

1981 births
Living people
Turkish cartoonists
Turkish illustrators
Marmara University alumni
Zaman (newspaper) people